Patrick Ferguson was a Scottish army officer.

Patrick Ferguson is also the name of:

Patrick Ferguson (drummer)

See also